Potentilla montana  is a species of cinquefoil found in France

References

External links
 
 

montana